Marvin C. "Whitey" Helling (May 16, 1923 – November 30, 2014) was an American football player and coach. He served as the head football coach at the University of North Dakota from 1957 to 1967, compiling a record of 60–35–3. Helling led the Fighting Sioux to victories in the 1965 Mineral Water Bowl and 1966 Pecan Bowl. During World War II, he served in the United States Navy and commanded a gunboat in the Pacific theater.

Head coaching record

College

References

1923 births
2014 deaths
American football running backs
Macalester Scots football players
North Dakota Fighting Hawks football coaches
High school football coaches in Minnesota
People from Luverne, Minnesota
Players of American football from Minnesota
United States Navy personnel of World War II
20th-century American naval officers
Military personnel from Minnesota